Payal Kapadia is an Indian author of Children's books. She is the recipient of the 2013 Crossword Book Award (Children's Literature) for Wisha Wozzariter.

Biography
Payal Kapadia was born in 1975 in Mumbai, India. She studied English literature at St. Xavier's College, Mumbai and received a M.S. in Journalism from Northwestern University in Chicago. She has worked as a journalist with Outlook in Bombay and as an Editor with The Japan Times in Tokyo.

Awards
2013 Crossword Book Award (Children's Literature) for Wisha Wozzariter

Publications

Young Readers
 Horrid High, Penguin India (2014), 
 Puffin Lives: B. R. Ambedkar, Saviour of the Masses, Penguin India (2014),  
 Wisha Wozzariter, Penguin India (2012), 
 Untold Tales from The Jungle Book: Col Hathi Loses his Brigade, The Walt Disney Company (2010),

References

External links
Payal Kapadia, official website
Payal Kapadia at Goodreads
Interviews
 "I Write In Confusion And Crisis" – Businessworld, 23 May 2012
 The Hindu 23 May 2012
 Live interview at Bookaroo 2012
 F-Page - Payal Kapadia 2015

1975 births
Living people
Indian women children's writers
Indian children's writers
Indian women novelists
Medill School of Journalism alumni
St. Xavier's College, Mumbai alumni
21st-century Indian women writers
21st-century Indian novelists
Writers from Mumbai
Women writers from Maharashtra
Novelists from Maharashtra